Monument Mountain may refer to several summits in the United States, including:

Monument Mountain (Berkshire County, Massachusetts)
Monument Mountain (reservation), an open space preserve 
Monument Mountain, an underground mountain located in Wyandotte Caves of Indiana

See also
Monument Peak (disambiguation)
Monument Nunataks, Antarctica